James Signorelli is an American film director and cinematographer. He was the film segment producer for more than 400 episodes of Saturday Night Live from 1976 until 2011. He has produced many of the commercial parodies for which the show is noted.

Selected filmography
Super Fly (1972) (director of photography)
Black Caesar (1973) (directory of photography, Harlem sequence)
Saturday Night Live (1976-2011) (film producer)
The Concert in Central Park, concert film of Simon & Garfunkel (1982) (producer only)
Easy Money (1983)
Elvira: Mistress of the Dark (1988)
Chance M. Romero's New Mistress of the Dark (2003) (film producer/himself)
January the 13th (2022) (film producer)

References

External links

Signorelli guest lecturing at the New York Film Academy

American film directors
American television directors
American cinematographers
Living people
Year of birth missing (living people)
Comedy film directors